Jack Bobridge (born 13 July 1989) is an Australian former professional racing cyclist, who rode professionally between 2010 and 2016.

In 2019 he was convicted of drug dealing and sentenced to a four-year prison term. He admitted to using banned recreational drugs during his racing career, noting that he used cocaine in training leading up to major cycling events, including the Olympics.

Career
Bobridge's career combined both track and road cycling.

In 2008, he was part of the Australian men's pursuit team that finished in fourth place at the Olympics, along with Graeme Brown, Mark Jamieson, Luke Roberts and Brad McGee.

He left the team at the end of 2011, and joined  for the 2012 season.

In September 2009 he won the under-23 time trial at the UCI Road World Championships. In January 2011 he became the Australian National Road Race Champion with a daring solo breakaway.  On 2 February 2011, he set a new world record for the track 4k individual pursuit. Bobridge was an Australian Institute of Sport scholarship holder.

At the 2012 Summer Olympics, he was part of the Australian team that won the silver medal in the men's team pursuit, with Glenn O'Shea, Rohan Dennis and Michael Hepburn.

Bobridge left  at the end of the 2012 season, and joined  on a two-year contract from the 2013 season onwards.

Bobridge won two gold medals at the 2014 Commonwealth Games, one in the men's team pursuit with Luke Davison, Alex Edmondson and Glenn O'Shea, where Australia set a new Games record in the final, and in the men's individual pursuit.

In November 2014 Bobridge was announced as part of the Team Budget Forklifts line-up for 2015 alongside fellow members of the Australian endurance track squad Luke Davison, Glenn O'Shea, Scott Sunderland and Mitchel Mulhearn, riding a domestic programme with a focus on achieving success on the track at the 2016 Summer Olympics.

Bobridge won the opening stage of the 2015 Tour Down Under. He lost the overall lead on stage three but finished the race with the King of the Mountains jersey. On 31 January 2015 Bobridge attempted to break the world hour record in Melbourne. He rode 51.3 kilometres falling short of the record of 51.852 kilometres. However he did break Brad McGee's Australian national hour record of 50.3 kilometres which had stood since 2000.

In 2016, Bobridge won his second Olympic silver medal, again in the men's team pursuit, this time with Alex Edmondson, Michael Hepburn, Sam Welsford and Callum Scotson.

Bobridge announced his retirement from cycling in November 2016. His retirement was due to the effects of rheumatoid arthritis which he was first diagnosed with in 2010.

The Jack Bobridge Track, a cycling and walking trail from his hometown of Gawler into the Barossa Valley was named for Bobridge when it was built in 2014, however the Barossa Council was concerned that this sent the wrong message to young people after he was convicted of using and selling drugs in 2019. In July 2019, the council resolved to remove Bobridge's name and rename the track to the Barossa Trail, a name already used for the northern and eastern extension.

Legal issues
In September 2017, Bobridge was charged with selling trafficable quantities of recreational drugs. In May 2019, during a court hearing concerning his case, he admitted to using recreational drugs, such as cocaine and ecstasy, during his active career. He claimed that he took them ahead of some races, but that they would be out of his body by race day. He denied the charges brought against him that he trafficked ecstasy. On 5 July 2019, he was sentenced to four years and six months in prison, being found guilty for four charges of drug dealing. He is eligible for parole after two years and six months.

Major results

Track

2006
 1st  Team pursuit, UCI Junior Track World Championships
2007
 1st  Team pursuit, UCI Junior Track World Championships
 National Track Championships
1st  Team pursuit
1st  Madison
2008
 1st  Team pursuit, 2007–08 UCI Track Cycling World Cup Classics, Los Angeles
2009
 Oceania Track Championships
1st  Individual pursuit
1st  Team pursuit
 1st  Individual pursuit, National Track Championships
2010
 Commonwealth Games
1st  Individual pursuit
1st  Team pursuit
 UCI Track World Championships
1st  Team pursuit
3rd  Individual pursuit
2011
 UCI Track World Championships
1st  Team pursuit
1st  Individual pursuit
 1st  Overall, Individual pursuit, 2010–11 UCI Track Cycling World Ranking
2012
 UCI Track World Championships
2nd  Team pursuit
2nd  Individual pursuit
 2nd  Team pursuit, Olympic Games
2015
 2nd  Individual pursuit, UCI Track World Championships
2016
 2nd  Team pursuit, Olympic Games

Road

2007
 3rd Overall Tour of the Murray River
 4th Time trial, UCI Juniors World Championships
2008
 8th Overall Tour de Berlin
2009
 1st  Time trial, UCI Under-23 Road World Championships
 National Under-23 Road Championships
1st  Road race
1st  Time trial
 1st Eschborn–Frankfurt City Loop U23
 3rd Overall Thüringen Rundfahrt der U23
1st Stage 2 & 5 (ITT)
 7th Overall Tour of Japan
1st Stage 4 & 6
2010
 1st Stage 5 Eneco Tour
 7th Overall Delta Tour Zeeland
2011
 National Road Championships
1st  Road race
2nd Time trial
 2nd Overall Herald Sun Tour
 5th Time trial, UCI Road World Championships
2014
 5th Road race, National Road Championships
2015
 Tour Down Under
1st  Mountains classification
1st Stage 1
 3rd Time trial, National Road Championships
2016
 1st  Road race, National Road Championships
 4th Overall Herald Sun Tour

Grand Tour general classification results timeline

References

External links

 
 
 
 
 

1989 births
Living people
Australian male cyclists
Olympic cyclists of Australia
Cyclists at the 2008 Summer Olympics
Cyclists at the 2012 Summer Olympics
Cyclists at the 2016 Summer Olympics
Commonwealth Games gold medallists for Australia
Cyclists at the 2010 Commonwealth Games
Cyclists at the 2014 Commonwealth Games
UCI Track Cycling World Champions (men)
Australian Institute of Sport cyclists
Olympic silver medalists for Australia
Olympic medalists in cycling
Medalists at the 2012 Summer Olympics
Medalists at the 2016 Summer Olympics
Cyclists from Adelaide
Commonwealth Games medallists in cycling
Australian track cyclists
21st-century Australian criminals
Criminals from Western Australia
Prisoners and detainees of Australia
Doping cases in cycling
Medallists at the 2010 Commonwealth Games
Medallists at the 2014 Commonwealth Games